is a former Japanese football player and manager and football commentator. He played for Japan national team. His son Kota Mizunuma is also a footballer.

Club career
Mizunuma was born in Saitama on May 28, 1960. After graduating from Hosei University, he joined Nissan Motors (later Yokohama Marinos) in 1983. The club won 1983 and 1985 Emperor's Cup. From 1988 to 1990, the club won all three major title in Japan; Japan Soccer League, JSL Cup and Emperor's Cup for 2 years in a row. In 1990s, the club won 1990 JSL Cup, 1991 and 1992 Emperor's Cup. In Asia, the club won 1991–92 and 1992–93 Asian Cup Winners' Cup. In 1995 season, he retired after he played in opening game.

National team career
In August 1979, when Mizunuma was a Hosei University student, he was selected Japan U-20 national team for 1979 World Youth Championship. He played all 3 matches and scored a goal against Mexico. This goal is an only goal in Japan team at this championship.

In April 1984, Mizunuma was selected Japan national team for 1984 Summer Olympics qualification. At this qualification, on April 18, he debuted against Malaysia. He also played at 1986 World Cup qualification, 1988 Summer Olympics qualification and 1990 World Cup qualification. He played 32 games and scored 7 goals for Japan until 1989.

Coaching career
In 2006, Mizunuma became an assistant coach for Yokohama F. Marinos. In August, he became a manager as Takeshi Okada successor and managed the club this season. In 2007, he resigned a manager and returned an assistant coach. He left the club end of 2007 season.

After retirement
Between 1996 and January 2006, he appeared as a pundit on TBS show "Super Soccer" (where he had a guest appearance on the second broadcast, which was a player in activity). He was also in charge of JNN News no Mori's "World Soccer Paradise" section  every Monday, and also appeared as a Monday commentator on the daytime variety show "Just". He was a soccer commentator for NBS on TV Kanagawa, and also a personality for "Kickoff !! F. Marinos" on TV Kanagawa until January 2006. He was also in charge of TBS Radio "Takashi Mizunuma no Sports Bomber!" between October 2002 and March 2003. Between 2003 and 2005, he coached his juniors as Hosei University coach at his alma mater. He also obtained an S-class license in 2004.

With a one-year contract from 1 February 2006 to 31 January 2007, he became the coach of Yokohama F. Marinos. Along with that, both"Super Soccer" and "Kick-off !! F. Marinos" shows were taken off the air. Furthermore, on 24 August 2006, he was appointed as a coach after Takeshi Okada resigned due to poor results. Although his team was prevented from being demoted to J2, he continued to be sluggish due to his inauguration without a concrete strategy, and decided to resign after the Emperor's Cup. In 2007, he became the coach of Yokohama F. Marinos again, but retired in one year. Mizunuma was the first former player from Marinos to become the coach of Yokohama F. Marinos.

In February 2008, it was announced that he would be reappointed as coach of the Hosei University Athletic Association Soccer Club.

In February 2010, he was a technical advisor to Tokyo 23 FC.

In addition, he wrote soccer commentary on sports channels such as SKY PerfecTV!, J Sports and wrote a column "Shūkyū 7 Days" every Saturday and Sunday on Yukan Fuji, and wrote "Mizunuma Takashi no Nice Middle!" on NumberWeb.

On January 22, 2012, he was elected as the director of Yokohama F. Marinos Old Boys at the Naoki Matsuda Memorial Game.

Club statistics

National team statistics

Managerial statistics

References

External links
 
 
 Japan National Football Team Database
 
 

1960 births
Living people
Hosei University alumni
Association football people from Saitama Prefecture
Japanese footballers
Japan youth international footballers
Japan international footballers
Japan Soccer League players
J1 League players
Yokohama F. Marinos players
Japanese football managers
J1 League managers
Yokohama F. Marinos managers
Association football midfielders
Association football commentators